Guy Williams is a visual effects supervisor. Williams and his fellow visual effects artists were nominated for an Academy Award for Best Visual Effects for the 2013 film Iron Man 3.
He was also nominated for Marvel's The Avengers and Guardians of the Galaxy Vol. 2. 

Williams is a native of Greenwood, Mississippi and an alumnus of Mississippi State University. He is currently a visual effects supervisor for Weta Digital in New Zealand.

References

External links

Visual effects supervisors
Special effects people
Living people
Year of birth missing (living people)
Place of birth missing (living people)